The Lamb and Flag is a Grade II listed public house at Rose Street, Covent Garden, London, WC2.

The building is erroneously said to date back to Tudor times, and to have been a licensed premises since 1623, but in fact dates from the early 18th century. The building became a pub in 1772.

Situated in what was a violent area of Covent Garden, the pub's upstairs room once hosted bare-knuckle prize fights, leading to it being nicknamed "The Bucket of Blood". A plaque on the building commemorates an attack on John Dryden in a nearby alley in 1679, when Charles II sent men to assault Dryden in objection to a satirical verse against Louise de Kérouaille, Charles II's mistress. Writer Charles Dickens frequented the pub in the 19th century.

The pub was refaced with brick in 1958.

References

Covent Garden
17th-century architecture in the United Kingdom
Grade II listed pubs in the City of Westminster
Fuller's pubs